Maria Maunder (born 19 March 1972, in St. John's, Newfoundland and Labrador) is a Canadian rower. Maunder was a member of the Canadian national team that placed second in the 1996 Summer Olympics and earned a silver medal.

Early life and education 
Maunder graduated from the preparatory school Ridley College in 1990 and matriculated to the University of Western Ontario. Though she went to the Olympics for rowing, she also swam, winning gold in the 50 and 200 meter free races under the Ontario Federation of School Athletic Associations during secondary school. At university, she participated in swimming and rowing. During that time, she also joined the university's chapter of the sorority Alpha Gamma Delta.

Career 
Maunder competed in her first major international tournament in 1994 at the Commonwealth Rowing Championships in Thames Centre, Ontario, Canada. Her Women's coxed eights team placed seventh at that year's World Championships in Indianapolis, USA, while her coxless fours team placed eighth. In 1995, her eights team won sixth place at the Championships in Tampere, Finland, while her coxless pairs team finished fifth. During the 1996 Summer Olympics, her team came in second and won a silver medal. Her quadruple sculls team placed sixth at the 1997 World Championships in Aiguebelette-le-Lac, France. In that year's Head of the Charles Regatta in Cambridge, Massachusetts, she placed first in the single scull event, as well as the singles and doubles for Canada's team at the Henley Royal Regatta in England. During the 1998 World Championships in Cologne, Germany, she finished eleventh in the double sculls. This race would be her last official competition, as she retired the following year.

Listed below are a selected number of her major races and the results:

See also 

 Rowing at the 1996 Summer Olympics

References 

1972 births
Living people
Canadian female rowers
Sportspeople from St. John's, Newfoundland and Labrador
Rowers at the 1996 Summer Olympics
Olympic silver medalists for Canada
Olympic rowers of Canada
Olympic medalists in rowing
Medalists at the 1996 Summer Olympics